Suzanna Antoinetta Snezana Dilber (born 16 July 1976 in Norrköping) is a Swedish actor and author.

In March 2012, she made her debut as an author with the novel Double Exposure, followed in 2015 by her second novel, Betrayed.

Selected filmography
2013 – Crimes of Passion
2011 – Arne Dahl: Misterioso
2009 – Beck – I stormens öga
2008 – Livet i Fagervik (TV)
2007 – Hoppet
2005 – Harry Potter and the Goblet of Fire (as Rita Skeeter's voice)
2005 – Wallander – Mastermind
2005 – Häktet (TV)
2003 – Paradiset

References

External links

Swedish-language writers
Swedish film actresses
1976 births
Living people
People from Norrköping
Swedish women writers
Swedish television actresses